Pierce Higgins (1977 – 20 January 2023) was an Irish hurler. At club level he played with Ballyhaunis and was also a member of the Mayo senior hurling team.

Career

Higgins first played hurling with the Tooreen club and won consecutive Mayo SHC titles in 1994 and 1995. He was later a founder-member of the Ballyhaunis club in 1997 and spent 20 seasons with the club's senior team. Higgins won a further 12 Mayo SHC titles between 2002 and 2016. He was joint-manager of the Ballyhaunis team that won the Mayo SHC title in 2020.

At inter-county level, Higgins first appeared for Mayo as a member of the minor team that won All-Ireland MCHC titles in 1994 and 1995. He later had a 14-year association with the senior team and was part of the panel that won the All-Ireland JHC title in 2003. Higgins also won several National League medals in Division 3 and Division 4.

Personal life and death

His brother, Keith Higgins, is a six-time All-Ireland SFC runner-up with the Mayo senior football team. Higgins was diagnosed with motor neuron disease in 2017.

Higgins died on 20 January 2023, at the age of 45.

Honours

Player

Tooreen
Mayo Senior Hurling Championship: 1994, 1995

Ballyhaunis
Mayo Senior Hurling Championship: 2002, 2004, 2005, 2006, 2008, 2009, 2010, 2011, 2012, 2014, 2015, 2016, 2020

Mayo
All-Ireland Junior Hurling Championship: 2003
Connacht Junior Hurling Championship: 2003, 2004
National Hurling League Division 3: 1998, 2003
National Hurling League Division 4: 2002
All-Ireland Minor C Hurling Championship: 1994, 1995

Manager

Ballyhaunis
Mayo Senior Hurling Championship: 2020

References

1977 births
2023 deaths
Tooreen hurlers
Ballyhaunis hurlers
Mayo inter-county hurlers